Shwe Eain Si (born 25 October 1998) is a Burmese actress, model and beauty pageant title holder. She was crowned Miss Golden Land Myanmar 2018 and represented Myanmar at the Miss Supranational 2018, which was held in Poland.

She was crowned Miss Grand Myanmar in 2017, but her pageant title was revoked after she posted a video online of her blaming the Arakan Rohingya Salvation Army (ARSA) for ethnic violence in Rakhine State.

Biography
Shwe Eain Si was born on 28 October 1998 in Naypyidaw, Myanmar. At age 12, she moved to London. She attended Epsom and Ewell High School which was located in Ewell east, Surrey, London. After having spent a few years in it, she then attended Rosebery school for girls which has good stats and the highest achievers within the London area. Both schools are government-funded and not independent schools attended by wealthy children.

Pageantry

Miss World Myanmar 
Shwe Eain Si joined the  Miss World Myanmar 2016. It was held on June 4, 2016, at Gandamar Grand Ballroom in Yangon. She was placed in the top 5.

Miss Universe Myanmar 2017
She competed in the Miss Universe Myanmar 2017  which was held on 6 October 2016 at Novotel Hotels and Resorts, Yangon, Myanmar. 
At the end of the event, she was placed 1st runner-up and won the continental titles for Miss Beautiful Hair, Best National Costumes Award and Miss Body Perfect Award.

However, she was stripped of her pageant title after she posted a video online blaming the Arakan Rohingya Salvation Army for ethnic violence in Rakhine State.

Miss Golden Land Myanmar 2018
She joined Miss Golden Land Myanmar which was held in the Grand Ballroom of Taw Win Garden Hotel, in Yangon on 14 August 2018. At the end of the event, she was crowned Miss Supranational Myanmar 2018 and represented Myanmar at Miss Supranational 2018.

Miss Supranational 2018
She represented Myanmar at the Miss Supranational 2018 pageant which was held in Krynica-Zdrój, Poland. She was placed in the top 21.

Acting career
Shwe Eain Si started her acting career in 2017. She made her acting debut with the film Tin String with actors Phyo Ngwe Soe, Eaindra Kyaw Zin, Ye Naung and Aung Yell Htwe.

In 2019, she played the leading role in the Burmese big screen film The Naked Ghost directed by Pwint Theingi Zaw. The same year, she starred in the film "Jin Party" alongside Yan Aung, Lu Min, Min Maw Kun, Ye Yint Aung, Htoo Aung, Eaindra Kyaw Zin.

Filmography

Personal life
Shwe Eain Si has been in a relationship with businessman Aye Ne Win since 2017. They are referred to as 'nationalist power couple' for supporting the anti-Rohingya movement in Myanmar.

References

External links
 
 Page

1998 births
Living people
People from Yangon
21st-century Burmese actresses
Burmese film actresses
Burmese beauty pageant winners
Burmese female models